Grajaú is a municipality in the Brazilian state of Maranhão.

Grajaú may also refer to:
 Grajaú, Rio de Janeiro, a neighborhood
 Grajaú, São Paulo, a neighborhood
 Grajaú (district of São Paulo)